Sungir (sometimes spelled Sunghir) is an Upper Paleolithic archaeological site in Russia and one of the earliest records of modern Homo sapiens in Eurasia. It is situated about two hundred kilometres east of Moscow, on the outskirts of Vladimir, near the Klyazma River. It is dated by calibrated carbon analysis to between 32,050 and 28,550 BC. Additional pollen finds suggest the relative warm spell of the "Greenland interstadial (GI) 5" between the 305th and 301st centennia BCE as most probable dates.

The settlement area was found to have four burials: the remains of an older man and two adolescent children are particularly well-preserved, and the nature of the rich and extensive burial goods suggests they belonged to the same class. In addition, a skull and two fragments of human femur were also found at the settlement area, and two human skeletons outside the settlement area without cultural remains.

History
This site was discovered in 1955, in the course of local digging from clay pits. Some 4500 square meters were excavated in sixteen field seasons between 1957 and 1977 (Bader 1965; 1967; 1978; 1998). Archeology teams from the Geological Institute of the Russian Academy of Science (R.A.S.), University of Groningen, Oxford University, and the University of Arizona in the United States have all worked on the excavations and related studies to review the findings from the site.

They determined that the cultural layer was located in what is called Bryansk soil, related to the period (thirty-two to twenty-four millennia ago) of the corresponding interstadial of the Valdai Ice age of the Late Pleistocene. Evidence of only surface dwellings on the site led the team to conclude it was likely used seasonally.

Burials

Graves 1 and 2 at Sungir are described as "the most spectacular" among European Gravettian burials. The adult male was buried in what is called Grave 1 and the two adolescent children in Grave 2, placed head-to-head, together with an adult femur filled with red ochre. The three people buried at Sungir were all adorned with elaborate grave goods that included ivory-beaded jewelry, clothing, and spears. More than 13,000 beads were found (which would have taken 10,000 hours to produce). Red ochre, an important ritual material associated with burials at this time, covered the burials.

The children are considered a twin burial, thought to have ritual purpose, possibly sacrifice. The findings of such complete skeletons are rare in late Stone Age, and indicate the high status of the male adult and children. The children had the same mtDNA, which may indicate the same maternal lineage, but new analyses determined they were not siblings.

The site is one of the earliest examples of ritual burials and constitutes important evidence of the antiquity of human religious practices. The extraordinary collection of grave goods, the position of the bodies, and other factors all indicate it was a burial of high importance. Two other remains at the site are partial skeletons.

The remains are held by the Institute of Ethnology and Anthropology of R.A.S., Moscow. In 2004, the International Seminar, "Upper Paleolithic People from Sunghir, Russia," was hosted by the Department of Archaeology, University of Durham, U.K. It is the second of two major conferences about this site.

Two books have been published in Moscow about the findings. Upper Palaeolithic Site Sungir (graves and environment) (1998) was the first complete publication about the site, including an inventory of artifacts, reconstruction of the Paleolithic man's clothes, archaic counting and calendar. The second part of the book displays the reconstruction of the environment by geological, palynological, zoological data.

The second book, Homo Sungirensis (2000) edited by T.I. Alexeeva et al., includes articles published since the first book, and new anthropological data derived from morphology, palaeopathology, X-ray study, histology, trace elements and molecular genetic analyses. It has an illustrated catalogue of all the skeletal materials.

Archaeogenetics
In 2017, researchers successfully sequenced the DNA of multiple individuals from Sungir, including one from Burial 1 (Sunghir I) and three from Burial 2: the two adolescent burials (Sunghir II and Sunghir III) and the adult femur accompanying the burial (Sunghir IV). The younger adolescent from Burial 2, Sunghir III, yielded high coverage genomes. Sungir III was previously thought to be female; however, genetic analysis shows that all four of the tested individuals at Sungir were male. Contrary to previous interpretations of the burials, genetic analysis shows that none of the individuals are closely related (none of the individuals were third-degree relatives or closer).

However, when compared against other populations, the individuals at Sungir are genetically closest to each other. The individuals at Sungir show closest genetic affinity to the individuals from Kostenki, while showing closer affinity to the individual from Kostenki 12 than to the individual from Kostenki 14. The Sungir individuals descended from a lineage that was related to the individual from Kostenki 14, but were not directly related. The individual from Kostenki 12 was also found to be closer to the Sungir individuals than to the individual from Kostenki 14. The Sungir individuals also show close genetic affinity to various individuals belonging to Vestonice Cluster buried in a Gravettian context, such as those excavated from Dolní Věstonice.

DNA analysis shows that the medieval individual Sungir 6 (730-850 cal BP) belongs to mtDNA Haplogroup W3a1, and Y-DNA Haplogroup I2a1b2 (I-A16681).

References

Further reading
 Upper Palaeolithic Site Sungir (graves and environment) (Posdnepaleolitischeskoje posselenije Sungir), ed. by N.O. Bader, Y.A. Lavrushin. Moscow: Scientific World. 1998. 
 Homo Sungirensis. Upper Palaeolithic man: ecological and evolutionary aspects of the investigation, ed. by T.I. Alexeeva, N.O. Bader, A.P. Buzhilova, M.V. Kozlovskaya, M.B. Mednikova. Moscow: Scientific World, 2000.
 The People of Sunghir. Burials, Bodies, and Behavior in the Earlier Upper Paleolithic., Erik Trinkaus, Alexandra P. Buzhilova, Maria B. Mednikova, Maria V. Dobrovolskaya. Oxford University Press, New York 2014

External links
 Von Schulz, Matthias. "Todeskampf der Flachköpfe" (German), Der Spiegel online, 20 March 2000

Stone Age sites in Europe
Prehistoric sites in Russia
Paleoanthropological sites
Cultural heritage monuments of federal significance in Vladimir Oblast